James, Jim or Jimmy Forrest may refer to:

Sports
 James Forrest (rugby union) (born 1907), Scotland international rugby union player
 James Forrest (baseball) (1897–1977), American baseball player
 James Forrest (basketball) (born 1972), American basketball player
 James Forrest (footballer, born 1991), Scottish footballer
 James Forrest (footballer, born 1894), Scottish footballer
 James Forrest (New Zealand cricketer) (born 1974), New Zealand cricketer
 James Forrest (South African cricketer) (1921–2010), South African cricketer
 Jim Forrest (curler), Scottish curler
 Jim Forrest (footballer, born 1927) (1927–1992), Scottish footballer
 Jim Forrest (footballer, born 1944), Scottish footballer
 Jimmy Forrest (footballer) (1864–1925), Blackburn Rovers and England footballer

Others
 Sir James Forrest, 1st Baronet (1780–1860), Lord Provost of Edinburgh
 James Alexander Forrest (1905–1990), Australian lawyer, businessman and philanthropist
 James Forrest (actor), American actor
 James Forrest (engineer) (1825–1917), British civil engineer
 Jimmy Forrest (musician) (1920–1980), American jazz saxophonist
 James Forrest (adventurer), English adventurer, hiker and author

See also
 James Goodwin Forest, forest near Carthage, North Carolina